Derek Tohill (born 30 September 1975) is an Irish rallycross driver. He currently competes in the 2016 FIA European Rallycross Championship Supercar class in a Ford Fiesta.

Tohill won the European Rallycross Division 2 Championship in 2010 and the Touringcar championship in 2013 driving Fiestas.

Racing record

Complete FIA European Rallycross Championship results

Division 2

Touringcar

Supercar

Complete FIA World Rallycross Championship results

Supercar

Irish Rallycross Championship results

Supercar

References

1975 births
Living people
Irish racing drivers
European Rallycross Championship drivers
World Rallycross Championship drivers
Place of birth missing (living people)